Bandar Tun Hussein Onn is a township in 11th-Mile Cheras (Batu 11 Cheras) in Bangi constituency, Selangor, Malaysia. It was named after the third Malaysian Prime Minister, Tun Hussein Onn (in office 1976–1981). It is primarily a residential area, established in the early 1990s. It is situated about 13 km southeast of central Kuala Lumpur and 7.5 km north of Kajang.

UDA Holdings Bhd is the developer of the Bandar Tun Hussein Onn township, was established in 1971 by the government, with authority to develop this area. In 1989, UDA Holdings acquired a  piece of land in Cheras known as Bandar Tun Hussein Onn. It is known as the largest housing development in Cheras Selatan. In 1995, Bandar Tun Hussein Onn won the FIABCI Award of Distinction for Residential Property. Upon completion, the total population has increased up to 35,000, consisting of 6,000 residential units.

Bandar Tun Hussein Onn is resided by 20,000 to 35,000 people or 6,000 housing units, where 80 per cent of the residents are Muslim (in 2013).

Facilities, Eateries and Shopping
Local Authority - Majlis Perbandaran Kajang as a local authority has an office in BTHO, located at Jalan Suasana 2/7.

Fire Station - A new fire station was built at Jalan Suakasih - Persiaran Suakasih intersection towards SILK Highway.

Banks - Town Park 1 house many banking facilities such as recently opened Tabung Haji in 2018, Citibank, Hong Leong and Pusat Zakat Selangor. Meanwhile, Maybank, CIMB, and HSBC are located adjacent to the township in Dataran Cheras of the Cheras Perdana township.

Eateries - There are many local eateries in BTHO namely local stores and McDonald's at Jalan Suasana 2/7, Jalan Suadamai 1/2 and Town Park or Jalan Suarasa 8/3 area. In Suarasa area, popular outlets are Marrybrown, Paparich, Pizza Hut, Domino's Pizza, Gulai Panas, Fatima Restaurant, Yusof Bistro, Burger King  and more. Food trucks are also a common scene at the parking lot opposite Citibank/Jalan Suarasa area lending some vibrancy at night to the normally calm and peaceful housing area. There are also many food stalls near McDonald’s such as Burger D’Suasana and Takoyaki Ball .

Shopping - There are a couple of shopping malls within 15 minutes drive of this township. Among them are ÆON Jusco Cheras Selatan Balakong, ÆON BIG (formerly known as Carrefour Cheras and Econsave Taman Cheras Utama. There is also a Mydin store at Jalan Suasana 2/7 (which is now called Pak Grocer), while mini-marts are abundantly located at Suasana, Suakasih and Suadamai areas. There is a Malay clothes store that opened in 2019 called Jakel which is more popular in Kuala Lumpur and Shah Alam

Others  - There are many other things in Bandar Tun Hussein Onn such as Lake Valley which has a 1 Mile walk and play grounds. Other than that, there are many other play grounds near houses such as the one in Jalan Suasana 2/5.

Health
There is one hospital named Columbia Asia giving medical services and 24-hours emergency response. The nearest public hospital is situated in Kajang. A new public health clinic (Klinik Kesihatan Bandar Tun Hussien Onn) was recently opened in April 2018, under Ministry of Health located on Jalan Suadamai.**

Education
There are four schools in Tun Hussein Onn: 
 Sekolah Kebangsaan Bandar Tun Hussein Onn.
 Sekolah Kebangsaan Bandar Tun Hussein Onn 2.
 Sekolah Menengah Kebangsaan Bandar Tun Hussein Onn 2.
 Sekolah Menengah Agama Tinggi Al-Rahman.

Places of worship
Bandar Tun Hussein Onn Mosque - Officially opened by His Royal Highness Sultan of Selangor in June 2016. UDA Land completed the construction in April 2013).
Surau Al-Amin (Located in Suasana zone)
Surau As-Siddiq (Located in Suadamai zone)
Surau Al-Ansar (Located in Suakasih zone)
Surau Al-Fathonah (Located in Suakasih Apartment compound)

Suraus is conveniently located in the respective housing zones, Suasana/Suakasih/Suadamai to serve residents in each community.

Access

Car
Bandar Tun Hussein Onn is primarily served by the Grand Saga Expressway (concurrent with Federal Route 1). It is connected to SILK Highway to Mines/UPM and Sungai Long, Kajang, and Semenyih. The local access route is connected to Alam Damai township via Jalan Suadamai.

Public transportation
 MRT Bandar Tun Hussein Onn, opened on 17 July 2017. MRT feeder bus provides transportation services along Jalan Sudamai and Persiaran Suasana to MRT Sri Raya. Car parks are abundantly provisioned at the Bandar Tun Hussein Onn station.

References

External links
BandarTunHusseinOnn.com
Bandar Tun Hussein Onn MRT Station
Kajang Municipal Council - administrator of Bandar Tun Hussein Onn
https://web.archive.org/web/20170509211701/http://ww1.utusan.com.my/utusan/Ekonomi/20130708/ek_21/UDA-Holdings-bina-masjid-Bandar-Tun-Hussein-Onn 
http://www.mpkj.gov.my/ms/rakyat/perkhidmatan/kaunter-kaunter
http://www.jknselangor.moh.gov.my/index.php/ms/carian-fasiliti/535-klinik-kesihatan/392-klinik-kesihatan-bandar-tun-hussien-onn 
http://www.kkr.gov.my/ms/node/34761
https://www.tabunghaji.gov.my/ms/pejabat-cawangan-th/th-cheras
https://www.propwall.my/insight/1233/lake_valley 
https://web.archive.org/web/20180502140504/http://www.uda.com.my/beginnings.php

Townships in Selangor